Joseph Ferdinand Doeve (2 July 1907 – 11 June 1981), better known as Eppo Doeve, was a popular Dutch painter and cartoonist of Indo descent. He was born in Bandung, Indonesia and moved to the Netherlands in 1927. He was invested as a Knight of the Order of Orange Nassau in 1973.

His cartoons were mostly published in Elsevier Weekblad and later in Elsevier Magazine.

He also drew two newspaper comics, Mannetje Bagatel (1946) and Kleine Isar, de Vierde Koning (1962), both with text by novelist Bertus Aafjes.

References

1907 births
1981 deaths
Dutch cartoonists
Dutch comics artists
Dutch illustrators
People from Bandung
Wageningen University and Research alumni
Indo people
20th-century Dutch painters
Dutch male painters
Dutch people of Indo descent
20th-century Dutch male artists